Laurie Hymes is an American voice actress known for voicing Lillie from Pokémon (2016), Yu-Gi-Oh!: The Dark Side of Dimensions (2016), Liz and the Blue Bird (2018), Yu-Gi-Oh! Arc-V, Regal Academy (2016) and Lupin III: The First.

Filmography

Television

Film
Pokémon the Movie: Volcanion and the Mechanical Marvel (2016, Raleigh)
Yu-Gi-Oh!: The Dark Side of Dimensions (2016, Sera)
The Snow Queen 3: Fire and Ice (2016, Gerda)
Fantastic Journey to OZ (2017, Squirrel)
Liz and the Blue Bird (2018, Mizore Yoroizuka)
Pokémon the Movie: The Power of Us (2018, Kelly)
Lupin III: The First (2019, Laetitia)
The Snow Queen: Mirrorlands (2020, Gerda)

References

External links 
 
 

Year of birth missing (living people)
Place of birth missing (living people)
Living people
American voice actresses
21st-century American women